Arakshaka is a 2012 Indian Kannada psychological thriller mystery film starring Upendra, Sadha and Ragini Dwivedi in the lead roles. The film is directed by P. Vasu. Krishna Prajwal has produced the film under Udaya Ravi Films. Gurukiran is the music director of the film. Karnataka`s former CM and State Janata Dal President, H. D. Kumaraswamy released the audio of the film. The film is loosely inspired by the 2010 Hollywood film Shutter Island.

Upendra has played a psychological role after a brief gap. He had last played such type of roles in his earlier psychological films like A (1998), Upendra (1999) which were directed by himself, and Preethse (2000).

The film was released on 26 January 2012 and opened to positive reviews.It turned out to be an average grosser but went on to achieve cult status later on.

Cast 
 Upendra as Arun and  Vishnu, twin brothers 
 Ragini Dwivedi as Dr. Nandini 
 Sadha as Catherine 
 Seetha
 Shayaji Shinde
 Sharan
Arasu Maharaj 
Mysore Ramanand 
Joe Simon 
Venkata Rao 
Cool Chinna 
Rajesh Nataranga 
 Jyothi Muroor
 Adi Lokesh
Vijaya Sarathi

Box office
Aarakshaka witnessed an average of 80% occupancy in single screens and around 60% in multiplexes. In rural places the film got 65% occupancy on opening day. The movie made good collections during its four-day weekend. The film’s first week gross was 3.42 Crore despite little publicity.  However, the collections fell during the second week mainly due to the release of Darshan starrer Chingari. The film’s second week gross was 1.5 Crore, bringing its two weeks total gross to 4.92 Crore, thus returning investment within two weeks. The film turned out to be just a moderate success.

Soundtrack

Gurukiran has composed 5 songs set to the lyrics of Kaviraj, Upendra and Hamsalekha

Reception

Critical response 

A critic from The Times of India scored the film at 3 out of 5 stars and says "While Upendra is super as a police officer, it's Ragini who steals the show with her brilliant emoting and body language. Sharana's comedy track is silly. Music by Gurukiran is okay. Cinematography by P K H Das is the highlight of the movie". A critic from The New Indian Express wrote "Gurukiran has done a neat job. The songs are melodious. VERDICT: Watch the movie, if you are ready to watch it twice. Else, it will be difficult for you to follow the plot line". Srikanth Srinivasa from Rediff.com scored the film at 3 out of 5 stars and says "Gurukiran's music is nothing to write about. But the songs are choreographed well with Upendra doing some unusual dance steps. There is a song in praise of Anna Hazare. P K H Dass has captured the locales of Kannur in all its glory. The film has been shot in Thailand as well". Shruti Gautham from DNA wrote "Vasu this time even seems to have run out of the luck that the letter ‘Aa’ had brought him in the case of Aapthamitra and Aaptharakshaka. Aarakshaka is not a film that is beyond your imagination more so if you have watched Shutter Island! ". A critic from Bangalore Mirror wrote  "Upendra gets a flattering makeover, resembling the composer.  P Vasu, who has been busy with various versions of Manichitrathazhu in the last few years, has not come out of that hangover yet. By choosing a somewhat similar 'mental disease' to cure, he has only fed the audience too much of a problem". B S Srivani from Deccan Herald wrote "The climax drags a bit but panders to the hero’s image. According to Upendra, even the intelligent will require repeated viewing to understand the entire film. But then, the viewer is not a fool either".

References

External links

2012 films
2010s Kannada-language films
Films directed by P. Vasu
Indian psychological thriller films
Films set in psychiatric hospitals